The 1909 International Lawn Tennis Challenge was the ninth edition of what is now known as the Davis Cup. For the second straight year, only the British Isles and the United States would challenge Australasia for the Cup. After defeating the British in Philadelphia, the US traveled to Sydney, but was defeated again by the Australasian team. The final was played at the Double Bay Grounds on 27–30 November.

Final
United States vs. British Isles

Challenge Round

Australasia vs. United States

References

External links
Davis Cup official website

Davis Cups by year
International Lawn Tennis Challenge
International Lawn Tennis Challenge
International Lawn Tennis Challenge
International Lawn Tennis Challenge
International Lawn Tennis Challenge